This is a list of airports in Morocco, sorted by location.

Morocco (al-Maġrib), officially the Kingdom of Morocco, is a country located in North Africa. Morocco has a coast on the Atlantic Ocean that reaches past the Strait of Gibraltar into the Mediterranean. It is bordered by Spain to the north (a water border through the Strait and land borders with three small Spanish exclaves, Ceuta, Melilla, and Peñón de Vélez de la Gomera), Algeria to the east, and Mauritania to the south. Its capital is Rabat, and its largest city is Casablanca.

As of 1997, Morocco is divided into 16 regions, the highest administrative division of Morocco. The regions are subdivided into a total of 61 second-order administrative divisions, which are prefectures and provinces.

As of 21 November 2017 the new NOS airport was given approval for construction and is expected to be the airport that serves Morocco for generations to come.



Airports 

Names shown in bold indicate the airport has scheduled passenger service on commercial airlines.

 Laayoun Annex Air Base (May be a section of Hassan I Airport GMML/EUN)

There are other unpaved airstrips in Morocco:
 Oum Dreyga Airport
 a  marked north–south runway at the Moroccan border control facilities south of Guerguerat.
 one rough dirt airstrip southwest of Tifariti
 two well defined dirt airstrips just west of Al Mahbes

See also 

 List of airports by ICAO code: G#Morocco
 Royal Moroccan Air Force
 Transport in Morocco
 Wikipedia: WikiProject Aviation/Airline destination lists: Africa#Morocco

References 

 
  - includes IATA codes
 Great Circle Mapper: Airports in Morocco - IATA and ICAO codes
 World Aero Data: Airports in Morocco - ICAO codes and coordinates

Morocco
 
Airports
Airports
Morocco